David James Jones (22 December 1886 – 23 July 1947), was a Welsh philosopher and academic.  He should not be confused with David James Jones (Gwenallt), a contemporary writer.

He was born in Pontarddulais and went to school in Gowerton. He studied at Cardiff University and Emmanuel College, Cambridge.  In 1915 he was ordained as a Presbyterian minister, and served as a chaplain on the Western Front in World War I.

Works
Hanes Athroniaeth: Y Cyfnod Groegaidd (1939)

References

1886 births
1947 deaths
Welsh philosophers
20th-century British philosophers
20th-century Welsh writers
20th-century Welsh educators